Mangelia vulgata is a species of sea snail, a marine gastropod mollusk in the family Mangeliidae.

This is a taxon inquirendum.

Description
The length of the shell attains 5 mm.

Distribution
This marine species occurs off Western Sumatra, Indonesia, and off Réunion.

References

 J. Thiele, 1925. Gastropoden der Deutschen Tiefsee-Expedition. In:. Wissenschaftliche Ergebnisse der Deutschen Tiefsee-Expedition II. Teil, vol. 17, No. 2, Gutstav Fischer, Berlin.

External links
  Tucker, J.K. 2004 Catalog of recent and fossil turrids (Mollusca: Gastropoda). Zootaxa 682:1–1295.
 

vulgata
Gastropods described in 1925